Colin George Smith (2 August 1935 – 21 December 2014) was a British former track and field athlete who specialised in the javelin throw.

Born in Harlesden, London, he took up throwing events while a young teenager at school. Trained by Bill Plumridge he went on to compete in over forty internationals for England and Great Britain. Smith competed twice at the European Athletics Championships, taking part in 1958 and again 1962, but did not perform well and failed to make the final round in either attempt.

He was a three-time winner at the AAA Championships, winning in 1958, 1959 and 1963. Prior to that he won the AAA Junior title in 1953. He was a member of Thames Valley Harriers during his career.

Smith served as a coach even in his younger years and assembled a training group comprising the majority of Britain's best throwers, including Dave Travis and John FitzSimons (both Commonwealth champions in their own right), John McSorley (a British record breaker), and John Kitching

In 1972, Smith and his family emigrated to Australia. After retirement in the New South Wales country, Smith, along with his wife and daughter, remained involved in athletics and coached regional level athletes around Sydney. Colin Smith died 21 December 2014.

International competitions

National titles
AAA Championships
Javelin throw: 1958, 1959, 1963

References

2014 deaths
1935 births
Athletes from London
People from Harlesden
English male javelin throwers
Commonwealth Games gold medallists for England
Commonwealth Games medallists in athletics
Athletes (track and field) at the 1958 British Empire and Commonwealth Games
Athletes (track and field) at the 1962 British Empire and Commonwealth Games
English athletics coaches
English emigrants to Australia
Medallists at the 1958 British Empire and Commonwealth Games
Medallists at the 1962 British Empire and Commonwealth Games